James Tilford Jones (December 25, 1876 – May 6, 1953) was a Major League Baseball outfielder.

Jones began his career as a pitcher. However, in his first game in the majors, he gave up 22 runs in 6.2 innings of relief against the Chicago Colts. The Colts scored a total of 36 runs in the game, which is still the major league record.

After his major league career ended, he continued to play in the minor leagues until .

Sources

Major League Baseball outfielders
Louisville Colonels players
New York Giants (NL) players
Knoxville Indians players
Paducah Little Colonels players
Charleston Seagulls players
Rome Romans players
Albany Senators players
Toronto Maple Leafs (International League) players
Centre Colonels baseball players
Indianapolis Indians players
Newark Sailors players
Montreal Royals players
Binghamton Bingoes players
Scranton Miners players
Richmond Pioneers players
Columbus Senators players
Grand Rapids Champs players
Milwaukee Brewers (minor league) players
Minor league baseball managers
Baseball players from Kentucky
People from London, Kentucky
1876 births
1953 deaths
19th-century baseball players